State Route 474 (SR 474, known as Merchants Greene Boulevard) was a  five-lane state highway in Hamblen County in the eastern portion of the U.S. state of Tennessee. It served as a connector route from SR 160 to US 11E/SR 34. It was decommissioned and designated as part of SR 66 following an extension project by TDOT in November 2020.

Route description

SR 474 began at an intersection with SR 160 (Gov. Dewitt Clinton Senter Highway) at a traffic signal southwest of Morristown. The route then proceeds northwest through rural areas of Morristown. It crosses over a Norfolk Southern Railway line then it continued to the northwest and meets its northern terminus, an intersection with US 11E/SR 34 (West Andrew Johnson Highway) in the western part of Morristown.

Major intersections

See also
 
 
 List of state routes in Tennessee

References

474
Transportation in Hamblen County, Tennessee
Morristown, Tennessee